The women's 400 metres hurdles at the 2022 World Athletics Championships was held at the Hayward Field in Eugene from 19 to 22 July 2022. It was won by Sydney McLaughlin in a world record time of 50.68 seconds.

Summary
There were high expectations for this final. The podium from the Olympics returned, who were the top three in history from that race, except that Sydney McLaughlin had improved upon her own world record at the American Championships on this track en route to qualifying for these Championships.  She had already set that record in the US Olympic Trials and the Olympics.  In most of those races, she was chased by the former record holder, defending champion Dalilah Muhammad, who set her last record in that race three years earlier, .07 ahead of McLaughlin who was then still a teenager.  The Olympic bronze medalist Femke Bol is even younger than McLaughlin.  Those three occupied the center of the track along with #5 all time Shamier Little.  #22 Anna Ryzhykova and #24 Britton Wilson were on the outside lanes of the track.

From the gun, McLaughlin was out fast, making ups the stagger on the fast starting Muhammad before the fourth hurdle and opening a huge gap in front of Bol.  Officially McLaughlin's split was 24.25 with her second 100 metres in 11.99.  And McLaughlin kept going, 12.77 for the third 100m, splitting at 37.02. Behind her it was a battle for silver and Bol edged ahead of Muhammad.  McLaughlin continued to charge, 13.66 for the final 100m, crossing the line 11 metres ahead of Bol with a new world record of 50.68.  Bol's time of 52.27 equalled her own second best time, the #12 time in history (McLaughlin owns seven of them, Muhammad three).  Five metres further back, Muhammad took bronze still three metres clear of Little and Wilson. McLaughlin's result would have beaten two finalists in the "flat" 400 metre run.

McLaughlin's 0.73 improvement on her own world record was called Beamonesque.  Since 2019, when Yuliya Pechonkina's world record had stood for almost 16 years, first Muhammad and now McLaughlin have taken one and two thirds seconds off the former mark, with McLaughlin after this race 0.9, almost a full second clear of Muhammad.

Records
Before the competition records were as follows:

Qualification standard
The standard to qualify automatically for entry was 55.40.

Schedule
The event schedule, in local time (UTC−7), was as follows:

Results

Heats 
The first four athletes in each heat (Q) and the next four fastest (q) qualify to the semi-finals.

Semi-finals 
The first 2 athletes in each heat (Q) and the next 2 fastest (q) qualify to the final.

Final

References

400 hurdles
400 metres hurdles at the World Athletics Championships